Ki (기), also romanized as Gi or Kee, is a Korean family name. According to the 2000 census, there were 26,679 people with this surname in South Korea.

 Gi Dae-seung (1527–1572), Confucian scholar
 Gi Ja-heon (1562–1624), politician, Yeonguijeong (Prime Minister) of Joseon
 Ki Tae-young (b. 1978), actor (Creating Destiny, Living in Style and Make Your Wish)
 Ki Hyun-seo (b. 1984), football player for Gyeongnam FC and Ulsan Hyundai Mipo Dockyard FC
 Ki Bo-bae (b. 1988), archer, gold medalist at the 2012 and 2016 Summer Olympics
 Ki Sung-yueng (b. 1989), football player for Newcastle United, former international for South Korea
 LilyPichu (Lily Ki) (b. 1991), American internet personality, musician, and voice actress, member of OfflineTV
 Ki Do-hoon (b. 1995), actor and model (Arthdal Chronicles and Once Again)
 Ki Hui-hyeon (b. 1995), singer and member of K-pop band DIA

See also
 List of Korean family names

References

Korean-language surnames